Adropin is a peptide encoded by the energy homeostasis-associated gene ENHO, which is highly conserved across mammals. Adropin's biological role was first described in mice by a group led by Andrew Butler, as a protein hormone, secreted from the liver (hepatokine), in the context of obesity and energy homeostasis. They derived the name "Adropin" from the Latin "aduro" - to set fire to, and "pinguis" - fat. In animals, adropin has been shown to have a regulatory role in carbohydrate/lipid metabolism, as well as in endothelial function. Adropin expression is regulated by feeding status, the biological clock, as well as upregulated by estrogen via ERa. In humans, lower levels of circulating adropin are associated with several medical conditions including metabolic syndrome, obesity and inflammatory bowel disease. The brain is the organ with the highest levels of adropin expression.  In the brain, adropin has been shown to have a potential protective role role against neurological disease, including in the context of brain aging and cognitive function, as well as following acute ischemia. The orphan G protein-coupled receptor GPR19, has been proposed as a receptor for adropin.

References 

Peptide hormones
Neuropeptides